BCBC may refer to:
 Brasenose College Boat Club
 Balliol College Boat Club
 Josephine Butler College Boat Club
 Bronx County Bird Club